Danny James Reynolds (born 27 June 1997) is an English footballer who plays as a defender.

Career
Reynolds was selected by Seattle Sounders FC with the 35th pick in the second round of the 2020 MLS SuperDraft. On 7 February 2020, Reynolds was signed by the Sounders' USL Championship side Tacoma Defiance. On 7 March 2020, Reynolds made his professional debut against Reno 1868 and logged an assist on the side's lone goal.

For the 2021 season, Reynolds joined National Premier Soccer League side Southern States SC.

On 16 December 2021, it was announced Reynolds would join USL Championship side Sacramento Republic ahead of their 2022 season. Following the 2022 season he was released by Sacramento without having made an appearance.

References

External links

Danny Reynolds at University of Louisville Athletics
Danny Reynolds at UNC Wilmington Athletics

1997 births
Living people
Brazos Valley Cavalry FC players
Tacoma Defiance players
USL Championship players
English footballers
Association football defenders
Louisville Cardinals men's soccer players
UNC Wilmington Seahawks men's soccer players
USL League Two players
English expatriate footballers
Expatriate soccer players in the United States
English expatriate sportspeople in the United States
National Premier Soccer League players
People from West Oxfordshire District
Sacramento Republic FC players